Al-Fulah is a town in West Kordofan State in Sudan and is the capital of the state.  The Chinese have shown an interest in developing a power station in Al-Fulah and building a  pipeline. Conflict during the Second Sudanese Civil War resulted in many people being displaced. It is the home of the University of West Kordofan.

References

Populated places in South Kordofan